Raven is a brand of smart speakers, developed by Chinese web services company Baidu. The devices connect to the voice-controlled intelligent personal assistant service DuerOS. The products are a result of Baidu's acquisition of Raven Tech in February 2017. The Raven H went on sale in December 2017, the first of three planned products under the brand.

Products

Raven H 
The Raven H is a smart speaker consisting of eight metal plates. The top detachable orange metal plate is capable of rising up and down, as well as a LED display touch controller. DuerOS is capable of voice interaction, music playback, providing weather, and hailing a vehicle from Didi Chuxing on the device. It was first introduced in November 2017 at the annual Baidu World conference in Beijing. On-board, the device has a Tymphany speaker. In China, the device became available in December 2017 for RMB 1,699.

Raven R 
The Raven R is a planned smart speaker with six moveable joints, used to perform simple function and express emotions on an LED display.

Raven Q 
The Raven Q is a planned home robot that will be able to move around a house, in addition to acting as a virtual assistant.

References 

Smart speakers
Products introduced in 2017